Ahmad Sa'di (Born 1958) is a Palestinian social scientist and a tenured professor in the Department of Politics and Government in Ben-Gurion University of the Negev. He is the author of multiple books. Most notably he co-authored Nakba: Palestine, 1948, and the Claims of Memory (2007) with Lila Abu-Lughod.

Books

 Nakba: Palestine, 1948, and the Claims of Memory with Lila Abu-Lughod, (Columbia University Press 2007) 
 Thorough Surveillance: The Genesis of Israeli Policies of Population Management, Surveillance & Political Control towards the Palestinians (Manchester University Press 2013)

References

1958 births
Living people
Academic staff of Ben-Gurion University of the Negev
Palestinian social scientists
Palestinian writers